Zenity is free software and a cross-platform program that allows the execution of GTK dialog boxes in command-line and shell scripts.

Description 
Like tools such as whiptail and dialog, Zenity allows easy creation of GUIs, though it has fewer features than more complex GUI-creation tools.

Cross-platform compatibility 
, Zenity is available for Linux, BSD and Windows. A Zenity port to Mac OS X is available in MacPorts and Homebrew.

As of 2018, Zenity ports for Windows are available: zenity-windows (based on version 3.20.0) and winzenity (based on 3.8.0 / statically linked)

Zenity does not possess any built-in scripting capabilities and it must, therefore, rely on an interpreter for processing. To create a script that runs on more than one platform without extensive modifications, it would be best to use an interpreter that is available on the widest range of operating systems. One option is Python in combination with the PyZenity library.

Examples

Python example 

from PyZenity import InfoMessage
from PyZenity import Question
from PyZenity import ErrorMessage

choice = Question('Please press a button.')

if choice:
    InfoMessage('You pressed Yes!')
else:
    ErrorMessage('You pressed No!')

POSIX shell script example 
#!/bin/sh

if zenity --question --text="Please press a button."; then
zenity --info --text="You pressed Yes\!"
else
zenity --error --text="You pressed No\!"
fi

Windows shell script example 
@echo off
zenity --question --ok-label="Yes" --cancel-label="No" --text="Please press a button."
if %ERRORLEVEL% == 1 goto error
zenity --info --text="You pressed Yes!"
goto end
:error
zenity --error --text="You pressed No!"
:end

See also 

 GTK-server
 Dialog
 List of GNOME applications

References

External links
 

GNOME Applications
GNOME Developer Tools
GTK
Sun Microsystems software